Ron Wilson is the host of the American nationally syndicated gardening tips and call-in program "In the Garden with Ron Wilson" which airs Saturdays from 6 to 9 a.m., Eastern Time, on many talk radio stations owned by iHeartMedia, Inc.  The show originates from 550 WKRC in Cincinnati, Ohio, and is syndicated via iHeart-owned Premiere Networks.

Wilson also does a 2-hour version of the show from 10 a.m. to noon on Saturdays heard exclusively on 610 WTVN in Columbus, Ohio.

External links
 In the Garden with Ron Wilson official website
 Photo gallery from some recent shows

Year of birth missing (living people)
Living people
American gardeners
American talk radio hosts
Radio programs on XM Satellite Radio